Urs "Ursinho" Sonderegger (born 28 April 1964 in Glarus) is a Swiss entrepreneur and racing driver. He currently competes in the World Touring Car Championship, driving a BMW 320 TC for the Wiechers-Sport team. Sonderegger runs an architecture and property firm called Atelier2000 Look GmbH.

Racing career
Sonderegger began his racing career in 2006. In 2007 he began competing in the SEAT León Supercopa in both Germany and Spain. In 2008 he began competing in the SEAT León Eurocup.

In 2011 he began racing in the World Touring Car Championship, driving a BMW 320 TC for the Wiechers-Sport team.

Urs and the Wiechers team agreed to part company part way through the 2011 WTCC season.

Racing record

Complete World Touring Car Championship results
(key) (Races in bold indicate pole position) (Races in italics indicate fastest lap)

References

External links
 

1964 births
Living people
People from Glarus
Swiss businesspeople
Swiss racing drivers
World Touring Car Championship drivers
SEAT León Eurocup drivers
European Touring Car Cup drivers